Winston Philip James Ide (17 September 1914 – 12 September 1944) was an Australian rugby union player. Ide played two Tests for the Australian rugby union team in 1938. He died during the sinking of the Rakuyō Maru in 1944.

Ide was a member of the Wallabies team sent to tour Great Britain in 1939. The outbreak of World War II saw the tour cancelled the day after the team had arrived at Plymouth.

On return to Australia, Ide joined the Second Australian Imperial Force and was sent to Malaya with the 2/10th Field Regiment. He was captured during the Fall of Singapore and interned in Changi Prison as a prisoner-of-war. Ide was later forced by the Japanese to work on the construction of the Burma Railway.

In 1944 Ide was boarded on the Rakuyō Maru—a Japanese "Hell Ship"—to be taken to Japan to work. The Rakuyō Maru was sunk in the South China Sea by a torpedo fired from the USS Sealion, an American submarine. The Americans were unaware the ship was transporting Allied prisoners-of-war. Refusing to climb aboard a liferaft, Ide assisted in the rescue of many of his fellow prisoners-of-war. Responding to requests to save himself, Ide was reported to have said "I'm staying here ... In any case, I can swim to Australia if I have to".

Ide was not seen again and was presumed drowned - one of 1159 prisoners of war aboard the ship who died. Only 63 were able to be rescued.

Ide's father, Henry, was a Japanese silk merchant who migrated to Australia in 1894 and was naturalised in 1902. During World War II, Ide's father was for a time placed in an internment camp at Hay in southern New South Wales as a suspected enemy alien.

References

External links
Player Profile: Winston Ide from ESPNscrum
Roll of Honour: Winston Phillip James Ide at the Australian War Memorial

1914 births
1944 deaths
Military personnel from Sydney
Australian people of Japanese descent
Australian rugby union players
Australian military personnel killed in World War II
Australian prisoners of war
World War II prisoners of war held by Japan
Australia international rugby union players
Burma Railway prisoners
Australian Army personnel of World War II
Australian Army soldiers
Rugby union centres
Rugby union players from Sydney